Moorhead High School is a public high school in Moorhead, Minnesota, United States. Established in 1883, the school serves approximately 2,000 students in grades 912.

Extracurricular activities
Student groups and activities at Moorhead High School include Destination Imagination, Apollo Strings, Business Professionals of America, carolers, drama, Key Club, Knowledge Bowl, newspaper, pep band, Science Olympiad, speech, debate, student council, and yearbook.

Athletics

The school's athletic teams, known as the Moorhead Spuds, compete in baseball, basketball, cross country, dance team, football, golf, gymnastics, hockey, lacrosse, soccer, softball, cross country skiing, swimming and diving, tennis, track and field, volleyball, and wrestling.

State championship titles held by the school include:
Basketball, boys': 1928, 1929
Football: 1971, 1987 (AA)
Golf, boys: 2012 (AAA), 2015 (AAA)
Track and field, boys': 1929, 1967, 1968, 1972, 1973 (AA), 1987 (AA), 1993 (AA)
Track and field, girls': 1973, 1974, 1975, 1999 (AA), 2001 (AA)
Volleyball: 1988 (AA)
Speech: 2016, 2017, 2018, 2019 (AA)

Notable alumni
 Jason Blake, professional ice hockey player
 Will Borgen, professional ice hockey player
 Ada Comstock, women's education pioneer
 Brian Coyle, three-term Minneapolis City Council member
 Mark Cullen, professional ice hockey player
 Matt Cullen, professional ice hockey player, three-time Stanley Cup champion
 Becky Gulsvig, actress
 Sydney Johnson, basketball coach, Princeton, Fairfield University
 Mark Ladwig, member of 2010 U.S Olympic team-figure skating
 Morrie Lanning, member of the Minnesota House of Representatives
 Brian Lee, professional ice hockey player
 Warren Magnuson, US Senator from Washington 1944–1981
 Olaus Murie, naturalist
 Arlan Stangeland, member of the United States House of Representatives 1977–1991
 Chris VandeVelde, professional ice hockey player

References

External links

Educational institutions established in 1883
Education in Fargo–Moorhead
Public high schools in Minnesota
Schools in Clay County, Minnesota
Moorhead, Minnesota
1883 establishments in Minnesota